KROV-FM is a radio station based in San Antonio, Texas. This community based non-profit urban station was founded by Tommy Ray Calvert, Jr. serving as its first General Manager. Started as the second HD Radio subchannel of KRTU-FM (91.7-HD2 FM), the station is currently available online. The "KROV" call letters stand for "Restore Our Voice" and are not registered with the Federal Communications Commission.

See also
List of community radio stations in the United States

References

2011 establishments in Texas
Community radio stations in the United States
Radio stations established in 2011
ROV-FM